Lorraine Mair (born 1948) is a former netball player who was part of the New Zealand team, known as the Silver Ferns, which came second in the 1971 Netball World Championships in Kingston, Jamaica in 1970–71.

Netball career
Lorraine Mair (née Frethey) was born on 2 May 1948. She played her first match for the Silver Ferns en route to Jamaica, in Barbados on 18 December 1970, but was little used during the world championships. She was the 51st woman to play for the Silver Ferns. Mair played in the Goal keeper (GK) position as well as Goal defence (GD) and Wing defence (WD). 

In October 2018, at the age of 70, Mair tossed the coin at the beginning of the Constellation Cup netball match between Australia and New Zealand in Wellington, New Zealand.

References

External link
Mair with the Australian and New Zealand captains before the Constellation Cup match in Wellington

1948 births
Living people
New Zealand international netball players
1971 World Netball Championships players